Majcen is a surname. Notable people with the surname include:

 Igor Majcen (born 1969), Slovenian freestyle swimmer
 Karl Majcen (born 1934), Austrian general
 Luka Majcen (born 1989), Slovenian footballer
 Nace Majcen (born 1968), Slovenian freestyle swimmer
 Rolf Majcen (born 1966) Austrian economist, lawyer, writer and ski mountaineer